George Louis Sheridan Scrimshaw (born 10 February 1998) is an English cricketer. A product of the Worcestershire academy system, he signed his first professional contract with the county in 2016 and was also called up to the England under-19 squad that year, but withdrew due to injury. He signed a long-term contract extension with Worcestershire ahead of the 2017 season and made his county debut in the 2017 NatWest t20 Blast on 5 August 2017. He was released by Worcestershire at the end of the 2020 season.

After a trial period, he signed for Derbyshire in March 2021. He made his first-class debut on 22 April 2021, for Derbyshire against Durham in the 2021 County Championship. He made his List A debut on 4 August 2021, for Derbyshire in the 2021 Royal London One-Day Cup.

References

External links
 

1998 births
Living people
English cricketers
Derbyshire cricketers
Worcestershire cricketers
Sportspeople from Burton upon Trent
Welsh Fire cricketers